This article is a list of events and openings related to amusement parks that occurred in 2016. These various lists are not exhaustive.

Amusement parks

Opening

China Nanchang Wanda Park – May 27
China Shanghai Disneyland – June 16
UAE IMG Worlds of Adventure – August 31
UAE Legoland Dubai – October 31
UAE Bollywood Parks Dubai – November 15
UAE Motiongate Dubai – December 16
United States Ark Encounter – July 7

Reopened
Italy LunEur – 2016

Birthday

Beijing Shijingshan Amusement Park 30th birthday
Blackpool Pleasure Beach 120th birthday
California's Great America 40th birthday
Canada's Wonderland 35th birthday
Chimelong Paradise 10th birthday
Dreamworld 35th birthday
Disney California Adventure 15th birthday
Downtown Disney 15th birthday
Gilroy Gardens 15th birthday
Happy Valley Beijing 10th anniversary 
Lagoon Amusement Park 130th birthday
Toverland 15th birthday
Magic Kingdom 45th birthday
Michigan's Adventure 60th birthday
Sea World (Australia) 45th birthday
Six Flags Great America 40th birthday
Six Flags Magic Mountain 45th birthday
Six Flags Over Texas 55th birthday
Six Flags St. Louis 45th birthday
Valleyfair 40th birthday
Warner Bros Movie World 25th birthday
WhiteWater World 10th birthday

Closed
 Dickens World – October 12
 Wet 'n Wild Orlando – December 31
 Wildwater Kingdom – September 5
 Pleasure Island Family Theme Park – October 29

Additions

Roller coasters

New

Relocated

Refurbished

Other attractions

New

Refurbished

Closed attractions & roller coasters

Themed Accommodation

New

References

Amusement parks by year
Amusement parks